Yuda may refer to:

 Yuda, Iwate, a town in Japan
 Abbreviation of the name Yehuda 
 Yuda, a character from Fist of the North Star
 "Dong Work for Yuda", a song by Frank Zappa from the rock opera Joe's Garage
, Tanzanian long-distance runner
, Chinese professional footballer

People with the surname
, Japanese field hockey player
, Indonesian karateka
, Kazakh former cyclist

See also
 Yoda, a character from the Star Wars universe
 Uda (disambiguation)
 Juda (disambiguation)

Japanese-language surnames